Certified Sarbanes-Oxley Professional (CSOXP)  is a credential awarded by the governance, risk & compliance group (The GRC Group). The CSOXP credential communicates that certified professionals have the knowledge listed below: 
 The key tenets of the SOX Act
 The history and impact of the SOX Act
 Industry-accepted frameworks and principles
 The role of audit committees
 Auditor independence
 Conflicts of interest and codes of conduct
 Whistleblower protection and corporate fraud
 White collar criminal penalties
 COSO ERM components (internal environment, objective setting, even identification, risk assessment, risk response, control activities, information and communication, and monitoring)
 Section 404 internal control documentation
 Entity-level and activity-level testing controls, techniques, effectiveness, and documentation
 SOX Section 404 project lifecycle management
Also, the certified professionals must have 1,200 hours of related experience (over the past three years).

Sources

Accounting qualifications
Professional titles and certifications
Sarbanes–Oxley Act